KKPK Medyk Konin is a Polish women's football club from Konin.

Medyk Konin was founded in 1985. Since its promotion to the top league, the team has always finished near the top. Their best result was 2nd place in 2002–03, 2003–04, 2005–06 and 2007–08. In 2007–08 the team only drew the penultimate game against KS AZS Wrocław, but in so doing lost a chance at their first title. The same fate happened again in 2010–11 when they lost on the last matchday to Unia Racibórz, whom they would have overtaken for the title with a win. In the 2014 season they secured their first league title.

The team won the Polish Cup in 2004–05, 2005–06 and 2007–08.

Titles 
4 Ekstraliga Kobiet titles: 2014, 2015, 2016, 2017
9 Polish Cups: 2004–05, 2005–06, 2007–08, 2012–13, 2013/–14, 2014–15, 2015–16, 2016–17, 2018–19

Current squad

Former internationals
For details of current and former players, see :Category:Medyk Konin players.

  Poland: Dagmara Grad, Agata Guściora, Ewelina Kamczyk, Klaudia Olejniczak, Ewa Pajor, Natalia Pakulska, Agata Tarczyńska
  Belarus: Anastasiya Kharlanova, Anastasia Shuppo
  Bulgaria: Liliana Kostova, Radoslava Slavcheva
  Croatia: Helenna Hercigonja-Moulton, Sandra Žigić
  Lithuania: Gabija Gedgaudaitė
  Montenegro: Jelena Sturanović
  Romania: Maria Ficzay
  Serbia: Nikoleta Nikolić
  Slovakia: Stanislava Lišková
  Ukraine: Anastasia Sverdlova, Iryna Vasylyuk

UEFA competitions
Konin played in the 2014–15 Champions League qualifying and advanced to the round of 32 after the second matchday.

References

External links 
 Official Website

Women's football clubs in Poland
Konin
Sport in Greater Poland Voivodeship
Association football clubs established in 1985
1985 establishments in Poland